Dehianga is a village in Sri Lanka.

History
Archibald Campbell Lawrie's 1896 gazetteer of the province described the village as a hamlet with inhabitants of potters and some Moor families.

Demographics
In the 1921 census, it was recorded that out of the population of 474 people, 134, or 28% of the population, was literate (more than double the 1911 literacy rate of 13%), although only 4 were literate in English (1911: 2). 99.6% of the population practiced Islam as their primary religion, and the other 0.4% reported practicing Hinduism.

See also
List of towns in Central Province, Sri Lanka

References

External links

Populated places in Kandy District